Nikhil Mathew is a singer from Kerala, India. In 2006, he won the Airtel Super Singer reality show. As the show's winner, he won a chance to sing a song for music director Harris Jayaraj – Enadhuyire along with Chinmayi, Sadhana Sargam, and Sowmya Raoh for the Tamil film Bheema.

Songs

Awards and nominations

References

Living people
Musicians from Kottayam
Tamil playback singers
Malayalam playback singers
1983 births
Singers from Kerala
Film musicians from Kerala
21st-century Indian singers
21st-century Indian male singers